Guildford Lido was opened in June 1933 by the Mayor of Guildford, Alderman William Harvey. It has been in continuous use for over eight decades.

Description
Open from late April to early September every year, and is drained while not in use over the winter. It attracts approx. 60,000 visitors each season.

The pool is owned by Guildford Borough Council and operated by Freedom Leisure, a not-for-profit charitable trust.

History
The lido was opened on 21 June 1933. The architect was J.W. Hipwood and cost £13,000 to build with funding raised locally rather than central government. This was an initiative of the Mayor of Guildford (Alderman William Alfred Harvey) who launched a campaign in 1932 to use local unemployed men to build the pool.

References

External links
Official Website
Guildford Lido at Guildford Spectrum
Friends of Guildford Lido
Swimming Pool FAQs
Lidos in the UK

Lidos
Buildings and structures completed in 1933
Sports venues in Guildford